Love Is Strange is the twenty-third studio album by country music superstar Kenny Rogers. It was released on September 11, 1990, by Reprise Records. The album includes the single "Love Is Strange", which charted at number 21 on Hot Country Songs that same year.

Track listing

Personnel 
From Love Is Strange liner notes.

 Kenny Rogers – lead vocals
 Matt Rollings – electric piano (1, 2, 3, 5, 6, 9), acoustic piano (4, 5, 7)
 Mike Lawler – synthesizers (1-5, 10)
 Phil Naish – synthesizers (1, 2, 3, 5–10)
 Larry Byrom – electric guitar (1), mandolin (2), acoustic guitar (3, 10) 
 Steve Gibson – electric guitar (1, 2, 4–9), acoustic guitar (3, 7, 9, 10), mandolin (3, 10), gut-string guitar solo (3), sitar (10)
 John Hug – electric guitar (3), acoustic guitar (4, 5, 6, 9, 10)
 Bernie Leadon – acoustic guitar (3), mandola (4, 8), mandolin (10)
 Glenn Worf – bass (1, 2, 6, 8, 10)
 Michael Rhodes – bass (3, 4, 5, 9)
 Joe Chemay – bass (7)
 Paul Leim – drums (1, 2, 6, 7, 10), percussion (6, 8, 10)
 Eddie Bayers – drums (3, 5, 9)
 Terry McMillan – percussion (1, 2, 10)
 Jimmy Mattingly – fiddle (4)
 Bobby Taylor – English horn (5), oboe (8)
 Bergen White – string arrangements and conductor (4, 8)
 Carl Gorodetzky – concertmaster and contractor (4, 8)
 The Nashville String Machine – orchestra (4, 8)
 Chris Harris – backing vocals (1-9)
 Mark Heimermann – backing vocals (1-9)
 Gary Janney – backing vocals (1-9), harmony vocals (6, 10)
 Dolly Parton – lead vocals (1)
 Vince Gill – backing vocals (2, 10)
 Jim Photoglo – backing vocals (2, 10)
 Harry Stinson – backing vocals (2, 10)
 Jim "Val" Valentini – harmony vocals (2)
 Jennifer O'Brien-Enoch – soprano vocals (4)

Production 
 Producers – Jim Ed Norman and Eric Prestidge 
 Production Assistant – Daniel Kee
 Engineered and Mixed by Eric Prestidge 
 Assistant Engineers – Robert Tassi and Jim "Val" Valentini
 Additional Engineers – Craig Hansen, Daniel Johnston, John Kunz and John David Parker.
 Recorded at The Loft, Digital Recorders and 16th Avenue Sound (Nashville, TN).
 Mixed at The Loft (Nashville, TN) and The Castle (Franklin, TN).
 Digital Multitrack Editing by Keith Odle at GroundStar Laboratories (Nashville, TN).
 Mastered by Glenn Meadows and Eric Prestidge at Masterfonics (Nashville, TN).
 Art Direction – Laura LiPuma
 Design – Heather Horne
 Photography – Bernard Boudreau
 Management – Ken Kragen

Chart performance

Singles 

Love Is Strange is home to three singles.  The title cut, a duet with Dolly Parton, debuted first and made it to number 21 in the U.S. and number 14 in Canada.  The follow-up single, released in 1990, was "Lay My Body Down", which reached number 69 in the U.S. but did not chart in Canada.  The final single, "What I Did For Love", written by Brent Maher and Tom Schuyler, did the opposite, charting only in Canada, peaking at number 81.

References

Kenny Rogers albums
1990 albums
Reprise Records albums
Albums produced by Jim Ed Norman